Pourquoi Pas ? is a research vessel built in Saint-Nazaire, France by Alstom Marine for IFREMER and the French Navy. She is currently primarily used by SHOM (Service hydrographique et océanographique de la Marine).  She was ordered in December 2002 and completed in July 2005.  The 66 million euro cost was financed by IFREMER (55%) and the French Navy (45%).  She is named after explorer Jean-Baptiste Charcot's famous ship. A space is required immediately before a question mark in French orthography, and accordingly, in French Pourquoi Pas ? is the correct way to write the name.

Pourquoi Pas ? is used 150 days per year by the French Navy and 180 days per year by IFREMER.  She was designed for hydrography, geoscience, and physical, chemical, and biological oceanography, as well as to launch small submarines such as the manned submersible Nautile and the ROV Victor 6000.

Notably, Pourquoi Pas ? has been used for the 2007 deployment and connection operations for the ANTARES neutrino telescope.

In 2008, Pourquoi Pas ? was used for the initial testing and operations of the PERISCOP, a pressurized deep sea fish recovery device.

In June 2009 she assisted in the recovery of Air France Flight 447.

External links 

  Pourquoi-Pas ? site at IFREMER 
 Netmarine
 BBC article about the PERISCOP

This article was translated from the original article from the French Wikipedia, in 2006.

Research vessels of France
Pourquoi Pas?
2004 ships